Polyrhaphis grandini is a species of beetle in the family Cerambycidae. It was described by Buquet in 1853. It is known from Brazil.

References

Polyrhaphidini
Beetles described in 1853